Philosophy of Management is a peer-reviewed academic journal that examines philosophical issues of management in theory and practice. The editor-in-chief is Wim Vandekerckhove. The executive editors include David Carl Wilson, Cristina Neesham, Eva Tsahuridu, and Vincent Blok. The book review editor is Marian Eabrasu. The founding editor was Nigel Laurie. The journal is published by Springer Publishing.

References

External links

Quarterly journals
English-language journals
Publications established in 2001
Business and management journals
Philosophy journals
Philosophy Documentation Center academic journals